Antonio Vallori (born 21 January 1949) is a Spanish racing cyclist. He rode in the 1974 Tour de France.

References

External links
 

1949 births
Living people
Spanish male cyclists
Place of birth missing (living people)
People from Selva
Sportspeople from the Province of Girona
Cyclists from the Balearic Islands
Sportspeople from Mallorca
Spanish Vuelta a España stage winners